Enrique Abaroa Martinez (born 10 January 1974) is a Mexican former tennis player.

Abaroa has a career high ATP singles ranking of 607 achieved on 2 August 1993. He also has a career high ATP doubles ranking of 170 achieved on 10 July 2000.

Abaroa represented Mexico at the Davis Cup, where he had a W/L record of 0–1.

Junior Grand Slam finals

Doubles: 1 (1 title)

ATP Challenger and ITF Futures finals

Doubles: 8 (6–2)

External links
 
 
 

1974 births
Living people
Tennis players at the 2000 Summer Olympics
Olympic tennis players of Mexico
Mexican male tennis players
Sportspeople from Monterrey
French Open junior champions
Grand Slam (tennis) champions in boys' doubles
Central American and Caribbean Games medalists in tennis
Central American and Caribbean Games silver medalists for Mexico